The semi-finals of the 1992 Summer Olympics roller hockey competition were staged between 1 and 5 August at the Pavelló d'Esports de Reus, in Reus. At this phase, a new group included the six teams which advanced from the preliminary round groups – Argentina, Brazil, Italy, Netherlands, Portugal and Spain. Every team played against each other one time, for a total of 5 matches, one match per day. In the end, the best two teams qualified for the final match to award the gold medal and the third and fourth teams competed for the bronze medal.

Matches

Day 1

Day 2

Day 3

Day 4

Day 5

See also
 Roller hockey at the 1992 Summer Olympics - Preliminary round

Notes

References
 
 

Roller hockey at the 1992 Summer Olympics